The Raja Alang Mosque is a historical mosque in Beranang, Sepang District, Selangor, Malaysia. It was named after Raja Alang, who was the son of Tengku Panglima Besar Selangor, Raja Berayun @ Raja Ibrahim, who ruled Kajang during Almarhum Sultan Sir Abdul Samad's reign. He was from Sumatra, Indonesia.

History
Raja Alang Mosque was constructed between 1904 and 1906. The mosque was officially opened in 1907 by Almarhum Sultan Sir Alaeddin Sulaiman Shah of Selangor.

Features
The mosque is similar to Alaeddin Mosque in Jugra. Its style is Middle Eastern with Moorish and Western influences.

See also
 Islam in Malaysia

Mosques in Selangor
Mosques completed in 1906
Sepang District
1906 establishments in British Malaya